Annette Dittert (born 3 December 1962, in Cologne) is a German author, filmmaker, correspondent, and journalist.

Life 
Dittert was born on 3 December 1962, in Cologne, Germany, where she grew up. She studied Political Science, Philosophy and German at the University of Freiburg and at the Free University of Berlin. From 1983 to 1985 Dittert worked as a journalist for the German newspaper Westdeutsche Allgemeine Zeitung. Since 1984 she was a reporter for a German radio network Sender Freies Berlin and later became an editor at the German television station Westdeutscher Rundfunk. From 1995 to 2001 Dittert was the head of ARD's breakfast show  that she also presented.

From July 2001 to July 2005 Dittert was the ARD-correspondent in Warsaw, Poland. From 2005 to 2006 she travelled through China, India and Africa for a four-part documentary  Abenteuer Glück, that received a Adolf-Grimme-Preis and a nomination for International Emmy Award by International Academy of Television Arts & Sciences in 2006. From 2006 to 2008 Dittert was the bureau chief and senior correspondent for ARD German TV in New York and since 2008 she works in London, equally as senior correspondent and bureau chief for ARD German TV. 
In 2019 she was awarded "political journalist of the year" for her reporting on Brexit.

Works by Dittert

Films (selection) 
 Erdöl, Bernstein and Kaschuben – Die polnische Ostseeküste. ARD, 2002
 Geld ist nicht alles. Mit einem Filmvorführer durch Masuren. ARD, 2003
 Der stille Bug. Reise durch ein zerrissenes Land. ARD, 2004
 Nur der Wunderrabbi ist geblieben. Reise in die jüdische Vergangenheit Polens. WDR, 2004
 Abenteuer Glück. Vierteilige Dokumentarfilmreihe, ARD, 2005
 Alltag im Schatten des Booms. New York City fünf Jahre nach 9/11. ARD, 2006
 Kofi Annan – Der friedliche Krieger tritt ab. ARD, 2006
 Harlem. Ein schwarzer Stadtteil wird weiß. SWR, 2007
 Hillary gegen Obama. Die Schlacht ums Weiße Haus. ARD, 2008
 Das Ende der New Yorker Bowery. Eine Straße verliert ihr Gesicht. ARD, 2008
 Nostalgie auf dem Wasser – Englische Kanalboote. ARD, 2008
 Inseln jenseits der Zeit – Die Hebriden. ARD, 2009
 Krieg der Kindergangs – Die Straßen von Liverpool. WDR, 2009
 Der Krieg: Ein Spaß für die ganze Familie. WDR, 2010
 Ihre Majestät, die Themse. Englands stolzer Fluss. ARD, 2010
 60 Jahre unter der Krone – Ein Leben als Queen. ARD, 2012
 Adel verpflichtet – Der Baron und sein Dorf. ARD, 2014
 Das Darknet - Eine Reise in die digitale Unterwelt. ARD, Dokumentation, 9. Januar 2017 
 Re: Polen vor der Zerreißprobe – Eine Frau kämpft um ihr Land. Arte, Dokumentation, 2017 
 Wohin treibt Polen? ARD 2018 
 Schicksalswahl Grossbritannien ARD 2019
 Freiheit für Schottland? ARD 2021

Books by Dittert (selection) 
 Palmen in Warschau. Geschichten aus dem neuen Polen. 2004
 Der stille Bug. Reise durch ein zerrissenes Land. 2004 (together with Fritz Pleitgen)
 London Calling: Als Deutsche auf der Brexit-Insel. 2017

Awards (selection) 
 2004: Hanns-Joachim-Friedrichs-Preis for her work as correspondent in Poland
 2006: Adolf-Grimme-Preis for documentation "Abenteuer Glück"
 2006: Publikumspreis der Marler Gruppe for documentation "Abenteuer Glück"
 2018: Nominierung Deutscher Fernsehpreis for "Das Darknet – Reise in die digitale Unterwelt"
 2019: Politikjournalistin des Jahres, Award by Medium Magazin

External links 

Official website by Annette Dittert
 WDR.de: London-Calling – ARD-Korrespondentin Annette Dittert zu Gast
 Kress.de: Ranking: Die 10 besten deutschen Politik-Journalistinnen und -Journalisten

References 

Living people
Writers from Cologne
German television reporters and correspondents
German broadcast news analysts
German women television presenters
German television presenters
German women television journalists
21st-century German journalists
Television people from Cologne
ARD (broadcaster) people
Westdeutscher Rundfunk people
Rundfunk Berlin-Brandenburg people
21st-century German women
1962 births